Nürnberg-Schweinau station is a railway station in the Schweinau district of Nürnberg, Franconia, Germany. The station is on the Nuremberg–Crailsheim line of Deutsche Bahn.

References

Schweinau
Schweinau
Railway stations in Germany opened in 1875
1875 establishments in Bavaria